Challenger, Challengers, or The Challengers may refer to:

Entertainment

Comics and manga
 Challenger (character), comic book character
 Challengers (manga), manga by Hinako Takanaga

Film and TV
 The Challengers (TV series), a 1979–80 Canadian biographical television series
 Challenger (1990 film), a television movie about the space shuttle Challenger disaster
 The Challengers (film), a 1990 family film produced for the Canadian Broadcasting Corporation
 The Challenger (film), a 2015 American sports drama film
 The Challengers (game show), a 1990 American game show hosted by Dick Clark
 Challenger (game show), a 1997 Australian game show
 Challenger (2013 game show), a Pakistani game show
 The original British title for the film The Challenger Disaster, a 2013 BBC made-for-TV film

Games
 Challenger (video game), a 1985 game developed by Hudson Soft
 Challengers (role-playing game), a 1985 role-playing game
 Challenger (arcade game), a 1981 game developed by Centuri

Literature
 Challenger (novel), a Star Trek: New Earth novel by Diane Carey
 Professor Challenger, a fictional scientist and adventurer created by Arthur Conan Doyle
 Challenger, a science fiction fanzine by Guy H. Lillian III which was nominated twelve times for the Hugo Award for Best Fanzine

Music

 The Challengers (band), a 1960s surf rock group
 Challengers (album), a 2007 album by The New Pornographers
 Challenger (Burning Star Core album), a 2008 album
 Challenger (Knut album), a 2002 album
 Challenger (Memphis May Fire album), a 2012 album
 "Challenger", a song by Misia from the 2004 album Mars & Roses
 Challenger, 2013 album by Recover
 Challenger (EP), a 2021 EP by JO1

Companies
 Challenger Limited, an Egyptian-based provider of contract oil and gas land drilling and workover services
 Challenger Ltd, an ASX200 listed investment management company

People and animals
 Challenger (actor) (19592010), Bangladeshi film and television actor
 Romeo Challenger (born 1950), rock drummer, father of Ben Challenger
 Ben Challenger (born 1978), English high jumper
 Okeem Challenger (born 1989), Antiguan and Barbudan footballer
 Challenger (eagle) (born 1989), an American bald eagle known for free flights
 Challenger (horse) (1927–1948), a British Thoroughbred racehorse

Places
 Challenger Deep, the deepest point in the world's oceans
 Challenger Plateau, a submarine rise in the Tasman Sea close to the New Zealand coast
 Challenger Mountains, a subrange of the Arctic Cordillera in Nunavut, Canada
 Mount Challenger, a mountain on East Falkland, Falkland Islands
 Challenger Point, a mountain in Colorado, United States
 Challenger Harbour, a marina in Fremantle, Western Australia
 Challengers, Saint Kitts and Nevis, a settlement on the island of Saint Kitts

Science
 Challenger Society for Marine Science, established in 1903 in the United Kingdom
 Challenger expedition, a British oceanographic survey in 1872–1876
 Challenger Center for Space Science Education, an American nonprofit educational organization

Sports
 Challengers League, former name of K3 League, an amateur football competition in South Korea
 Challengers Cup, a South Korean football competition
 ATP Challenger Tour, a series of men's professional tennis tournaments
 Challenger (America's Cup), the yacht representing the club that currently opposes the defender
 PCB Challengers, a Pakistani women's cricket team

Transportation

Air and space craft
 Bombardier Challenger, a series of business jets manufactured by Bombardier
 Space Shuttle Challenger, a NASA space shuttle
 Space Shuttle Challenger disaster
 Quad City Challenger, an ultralight airplane
 Challenger, the Apollo 17 lunar module

Land vehicles
 Challenger trucks, a Canadian maker of heavy trucks
 There have been four tanks named Challenger in British military service.
 Cruiser Mk VIII Challenger in service during World War II
 Challenger 1 in service from the mid-1980s to early 21st century
 Challenger 2 in service from 1998 onwards
 Challenger 3 in development; predicted to enter service from 2027 onwards

 Dodge Challenger, a car made by Dodge
 Mitsubishi Pajero Sport, an SUV once sold in Japan as the Mitsubishi Challenger
 Tokai Challenger, a solar car
 Challenger (train), a named passenger train fleet
 Union Pacific Challenger, a type of steam locomotive
 Challenger Tractor, a rubber-tracked agricultural tractor

Sea vessels
 Columbia 24 Challenger, an American sailboat design
 HMS Challenger, any of eight Royal Navy ships
 RSS Challenger, a Sjöormen-class submarine in the Republic of Singapore Navy
 USS Challenger (ID-3630), an early-20th century US Navy cargo ship
 Challenger (clipper), a clipper sailing ship built in London in 1852
 Challenger (1853 clipper), a clipper ship built in Boston
 Challenger (Long Beach fireboat), operated by the fire department of Long Beach, California, US
 , a steamboat built in 1865 that operated in Puget Sound, Washington, US
 Stena Challenger, a ferry, formerly Isle of Inishfree and Pride of Cherbourg, now MV Kaitaki
 Glomar Challenger, a deep sea research and scientific drilling vessel for oceanography and marine geology studies
 Deepsea Challenger, used by James Cameron in the Mariana Trench
 SS St. Marys Challenger, a freight vessel operating on the North American Great Lakes built in 1906

Other uses
Challenger Institute of Technology, former name of South Metropolitan TAFE, a Technical and Further Education institution in Fremantle, Western Australia
 Challenger hop, a beer flavouring
 Challenger mine, a gold mine in South Australia
 Challenger Secondary School, a public school in Spanaway, Washington, United States
 Challenger Early College High School, a public secondary school in Hickory, North Carolina, United States
 Challenger (cable system), an international submarine communications cable between US and Bermuda
 Challenger, a line of microcomputer systems manufactured by Ohio Scientific

See also
 Challenge (disambiguation)
 The Challenge (disambiguation)
 Challenge Cup (disambiguation)